Aye Write, originally stylized as Aye Write!, is an annual book festival which takes place in Glasgow, Scotland in late February or early March.

History
The first Aye Write festival was in 2005. Originally intended to occur once every two years, Aye Write announced in 2007 that the book festival would become an annual event. In response to the COVID-19 pandemic, the festival was cancelled in 2020, and was online-only in 2021. Aye Write returned to in-person festivities in 2022.

Participants
The 2016 line-up includes Christopher Brookmyre, Limmy, and Stuart Cosgrove.

People who have taken part in the festival include: Edwin Morgan, William McIlvanney, Ian McEwan, Iain Banks, Denise Mina, Louise Welsh, Jackie Kay, Andrew Motion, Lynne Truss, Jenny Colgan, John Burnside, and others.

Clare Maclean Prize
The Clare Maclean Prize for Scottish Fiction was awarded for the first time at the 2008 festival, in memory of Claire Maclean, the partner of Prof. Mike Gonzalez, with a £3000 first prize. It is open to any book written by a Scottish author (or someone working in Scotland) in the previous twelve months.

2008 shortlist
Old Men In Love by Alasdair Gray
Girl Meets Boy by Ali Smith
Gold by Dan Rhodes - winner
The Steep Approach to Garbadale by Iain Banks
The Devil's Footprints by John Burnside
Day by A L Kennedy

References

External links 
 

Literary festivals in Scotland